János Farkas (27 March 1942 in Budapest – 29 September 1989 in Budapest) was a Hungarian footballer.

During his club career he played for Vasas SC. He earned 33 caps and scored 20 goals for the Hungary national football team from 1961 to 1969, and participated in the 1962 FIFA World Cup, the 1964 European Nations' Cup, and the 1966 FIFA World Cup. He also won a gold medal in football at the 1964 Summer Olympics.
He is particularly remembered for his fabulous goal at the 1966 FIFA World Cup against Brazil, contributing to a sensational 3–1 win against the incumbent champions.
He finished his career rather early, at the age of 30, and became a gastronomer. He died at the age of 47 of a heart attack. A youth football tournament was named after him following his death.

Career statistics

References

External links
 
 Hungary - Record International Players

External links
 

1942 births
1989 deaths
Hungarian footballers
Hungary international footballers
Olympic footballers of Hungary
Olympic gold medalists for Hungary
Olympic medalists in football
Footballers at the 1964 Summer Olympics
Medalists at the 1964 Summer Olympics
1962 FIFA World Cup players
1964 European Nations' Cup players
1966 FIFA World Cup players
Vasas SC players
Footballers from Budapest
Association football forwards